Belting (or vocal belting) is a specific technique of singing by which a singer carries their chest voice above their break or passaggio with a proportion of head voice. Belting is sometimes described as "high chest voice" or "mixed voice" (not to be confused with the mixing technique), although if this is done incorrectly it can potentially be damaging for the voice. It is often described as a vocal register, although this is also technically incorrect; it is rather a descriptive term for the use of a register. Singers can use belting to convey heightened existential states.

Belting became commonplace in Broadway musicals following Ethel Merman's performance in Girl Crazy (1930), notably in the song "I Got Rhythm". The opening credit sequence of the James Bond film Goldfinger (1964) features a title song performed by Shirley Bassey, which established belting as a signature quality of the James Bond films that continued through to the following century.

Overlap with mixing

Belting is sometimes confused with mixing, in which chest voice and head voice are blended. A belted voice can be mixed or not, and a mixed voice can be belted or not.

Technique

"Chest register" is the lowest register of the singing voice, produced by dominant use of the thyroarytenoid muscle. The term "belt" is the use of a chest voice in the higher part of the voice. The chest voice is a general term for the sound and muscular functions of the speaking voice, singing in the lower range, and the voice used to shout. Each of those functions requires a thicker closure of the vocal folds and the support of the muscles surrounding them. Therefore, the term "chest voice" is a misnomer when it describes muscular work in the chest area of the body or a resonance therein. Proper production of the belt voice, according to some vocal methods, involves minimizing tension in the throat and a change of typical placement of the voice sound in the mouth, bringing it forward into the hard palate, although techniques vary by pedagogical style.

It is possible to learn classical vocal methods like bel canto and also to be able to belt; in fact, many roles now require it. Vocalists trained in a wide range of styles describe vastly varying experiences in the learning belt technique. Some claim that it comes naturally, while others struggle to access chest register other than while speaking. The style of music does not seem to be a related factor, other than in a singer's exposure to the material.

Belt technique requires muscle coordination not readily used in classically trained singers as the thyroarytenoid muscle is dominant (as opposed to head register singing where the cricothyroid muscle is dominant), which may be why some opera singers find learning to belt challenging.

Physiology
There are many explanations as to how the belting voice quality is produced. Under a scope, the vocal folds visibly shorten and thicken, and they undulate along with more of their vertical surface area than in head register when a smaller segment of their edge must undulate to produce sound.

One researcher, Jo Estill, has conducted research on the belting voice, and describes the belting voice as an extremely muscular and physical way of singing. When observing the vocal tract and torso of singers, while belting, Estill observed:

 Minimal airflow (longer closed phase (70% or greater) than in any other type of phonation)
 Maximum muscular engagement of the torso (in Estill Voice Training terminology this is known as Torso Control or Anchoring)
 Engagement of muscles in the head and neck in order to stabilize the larynx) (in Estill Voice Training terminology this is known as Head and Neck Control or Anchoring)
 A downward tilt of the cricoid cartilage (an alternative option would be the thyroid tilting backward. Observations show a larger CT space)
 High positioning of the larynx
 Maximum muscular effort of the extrinsic laryngeal muscles, minimum effort at the level of the true vocal folds.
 Narrowing of the aryepiglottic sphincter (the "twanger")

Possible dangers
Belting without proper coordination can lead to constriction of the muscles surrounding the vocal mechanism.  Constriction can consequently lead to vocal deterioration. Correct use of the technique and, most importantly, retraction of the ventricular folds while singing is vital to safe belting, as it is, in essence a form of "yell" and thus involves a tremendous (roughly +70%) increase in the force exerted on the soft structures of the pharynx vs. more common modes of singing. Attempting to belt too loudly, in too high a register and without properly supporting the ventricular folds are (in combination) the "Three Devils" of the belter; an untrained belter may well consider the short-term irritations (hoarseness, throat pain) caused by bad form to be just a "part of the job", when in reality it indicates a flaw in their belting skill that will cause long-term serious damage (vocal cord nodules, irreversible loss of former range and timbre) if not changed.

While acknowledging the extra risks inherent to belting, many proponents take pains to point out that it is an advanced skill which (so long as it is a "soft yell", and produced properly without straining and pain) is no more damaging to the voice than any other type of singing. Indeed, some genres of singing (such as blues rock) rely on belting to allow the vocalist to "cut through" the electric guitar while playing live. Many in the musical theater industry like to quip, "belting is not bad; bad belting is bad."

As for the physiological and acoustical features of the metallic voice, a master's thesis has drawn the following conclusions:
 No significant changes in frequency and amplitude of F1 were observed.
 Significant increases in amplitudes of F2, F3 and F4 were found.
 In frequencies for F2, metallic voice perceived as louder was correlated to increase in amplitude of F3 and F4.
 Vocal tract adjustments like velar lowering, pharyngeal wall narrowing, laryngeal raising, aryepiglottic and lateral laryngeal constriction were frequently found.

References

Singing techniques